The World Parkinson Congress, often referred to as the WPC, is a non-religious, non-political, and non-profit making organization concerned with the health and welfare of people living with Parkinson's disease (PD) and their families and caregivers.  Founded in 2004, the WPC aims to bring the Parkinson's community together, under one roof, to allow for cross-pollination of community leaders to create opportunities to generate more robust ideas around the science and care of Parkinson's. The WPC Inc. has nearly 170 Organizational Partners from around the world. 

There is no other International meeting focused just on Parkinson's disease, nor is there an international format that looks at Parkinson's science and care that also invites people with Parkinson's to have a seat at the table. 

Each World Parkinson Congress provides a unique forum for partnership between international patient and neurological organizations, the pharmaceutical industry. The 1st World Parkinson Congress was held February 22 - 26, 2006 in Washington, DC, USA. WPC 2006 attracted more than 3,150 delegates from nearly 60 countries; the WPC 2010 held September 28 - October 1, 2010 was in Glasgow, United Kingdom had more than 3,000; WPC 2013 held October 1 - 4, 2013in Montreal, Canada had more than 3,300 delegates. Those delegates included a unique mix of: health professionals and researchers; 1100 people with Parkinson's, care partners and guests; and members of press. WPC 2013 had more than 3,300 delegates and the WPC 2016 in Portland, Oregon had over 4,550 delegates from 65 countries. The last congress took place in Kyoto, Japan in June, 2019 which attracted 2,777 delegates from 60 countries to hear 180 speakers over the course of four days.

WPC launched the WPC Blog in April 2017, an inclusive site with posts from a wide range of experts across the globe who research, treat, and live with Parkinson's disease.

The 6th World Parkinson Congress was held in Spain in June 2022.

References

External links 
 
WPC 2022 
WPC Congress
Where is Parky?

Parkinson's disease
Medical conferences
Patients' organizations
International conferences
Recurring events established in 2006